Tribal belt may refer to:

India tribal belt
Pakistan tribal belt
Tribal belt of Afghanistan